Line 9 of the Beijing Subway is a rapid transit line in western Beijing. All stations are fully underground. Line 9's color is chartreuse.

History

In 1989, the State Council decided to build Beijing West railway station on the Beijing-Kowloon railway. Subway planning had determined that Beijing West railway station would be the interchange between Lines 7 and 9. However, no provision for an interchange station was added in the railway station's design. The railway station was completed in 1996. 15 years later Beijing West Station was rebuilt and expanded with provisions added to the basement of the station for Lines 7 and 9. In 2002, in preparation for the 2008 Beijing Olympics, it was proposed that the first section of Line 9 should be built between Baishiqiao and Beijing West railway station (today's National Library to Beijing West railway station section). The entire length of the proposed line was 5.8 kilometers. However, the line only started construction in April 2007, with a planned opening date of 2010 and the original northern section between Baishiqiao to Beijing West Station was further delayed until 2012, making an opening before the Olympics unlikely. In the meantime, planners were investigating the possibility of extending Line 9 northwest beyond Baishiqiao and roughly paralleling the almost complete Line 4. However, this Baishiqiao-Wenyang Road Project would head further north to the Haidan area, terminating around the Wenyang Road (温阳路) exit of the 6th Ring Road competing with another proposal where Line 4's northern extension would serve the area. The extension project was would be 25.5 km long and add 13 new stations, creating a 40.7 km long Line 9. However, this project was cut back to the current terminus at  Station with the remaining sections north was ultimately redesigned as neither Line 9 or Line 4 but replaced by Line 16.

At the time the line was only connected to the Fangshan Line, isolated from the rest of the Beijing Subway network. Passengers had to transfer to shuttle buses that connected to the main subway network to continue their journey., making the line sparsely used in 2011. The situation did not improve on April 29, 2012 when the Beijing subway exceeded a record 8 million daily riders, with the daily ridership of Line 9 being only 46,300 as it was still isolated from the rest of the network.

After then replacement Baishiqiao-Wenyang Road Project with Line 16, another proposal was made to extend Line 9 north at around 2011. This time Line 9 would be extended north forming a north south corridor just west of Line 13 with an interchange with the proposed Line 15 western extension at Xueyuan Road Station. The extension would terminate at Xi'erqi station and help relieve the congestion on the western arc of Line 13 and more directly serve  Tsinghua University.

On December 30, 2012, the original northern section from the Beijing West railway station to the  entered into operation. This finally connected Line 9 and the Fangshan Line to the rest of the subway network and made all major Beijing train stations accessible by subway. The underground connections for the transfer between Line 9 and Line 1 were not completed at the opening of the Line 9 extension. Between December 2012 and December 2013, Line 9 skipped Military Museum station.  Line 9's passenger traffic began to grow rapidly after the northern section went into operation. As of January 2013, the average daily passenger traffic was already three times higher than in December 2012, at 220,000 rides. The Line 1 to Line 9 transfer was completed at the Military Museum Station on December 21, 2013.

In 2013, the northern extension proposal was modified again, while still a line connecting National Library to Xi'erqi the line was now shifted to swing east of Line 13. Later, it was decided that this northern extension project is to be divided into two lines at Mingguangqiao West Station. The Southern portion of Mingguangqiao West Station to the National Library Station will still be the north extension line of Line 9. However, Mingguangqiao West Station north to Xi'erqi Station is now replaced by the southern extension of the Changping line. However, in reality during construction, only the south extension project of the Changping Line from Xi'erqi to Jimenqiao Stations actually started construction, the last remaining section of the Changping Line’s south extension to Mingguangqiao West Station and the entire northern extension section of Line 9 (Mingguangqiao West to National Library Station) was put on hold. Also, during that time it was proposed that Line 9 be extended south beyond Guogongzhuang along the west side of Daxing New Town to the Biomedical Base station in the long term, with a total length of 18 kilometers and 8 stations.

List of Stations

Through service 

In 2021, it was announced that there will be some through service between Line 9 and the Fangshan line. The operator is retrofitting the signal systems of both lines to achieve this. Through service started on 18 January 2023.

Rolling Stock
Line 9 is served by a fleet of 37 6-car DKZ33 trains built by CNR Changchun.

Gallery

References

Beijing Subway lines
Articles containing video clips
Railway lines opened in 2011
2011 establishments in China
750 V DC railway electrification